Karabash may refer to:

Places
Karabash Reservoir, a fresh water reservoir in the Republic of Tatarstan, Russia
Karabash (inhabited locality), several inhabited localities in Russia

People
Alex Karabash, Soviet/Russian chemist and inventor, an alumnus of the Moscow State University of Fine Chemical Technologies
Dmytro Karabash, one of the recipients of the 2007 Van Amringe Mathematical Prize

Other
Karabaş (Karabash), alternative name for Anatolian Shepherd Dog, a dog breed